Cortez Thaddeus Ham Jr. (born July 22, 1993) is an American football fullback for the Minnesota Vikings of the National Football League (NFL). He went undrafted in the 2016 NFL Draft. He played college football at Augustana.

High school career
Ham graduated from Duluth Denfeld High School in 2011, where he starred in football and track and field. In football, Ham played as a running back under head coaches Frank Huie and Chris Vold, and was a three-year letterwinner and two-year starter for the Hunters, logging 1,873 total yards and 24 touchdowns between his junior and senior seasons. On defense, he recorded 109 tackles. He was an all-conference and all-section selection and received an all-state honorable mention in recognition of his successful season.

College career
Ham attended Augustana University in Sioux Falls, South Dakota from 2011 to 2015, where he was a four-year letterwinner in both football and track & field. In his football career with the Augustana Vikings, Ham rushed for 2,662 yards and 29 touchdowns, and also had 949 yards receiving and six touchdowns, including 39 catches for 431 yards and three touchdowns in his final season. In track and field, Ham was a two-time All-NSIC honoree in the shot put. He currently holds the school record in the indoor weight throw and the outdoor hammer throw.

Football
As a redshirt freshman, in 2012, Ham appeared in nine games, making three starts at fullback. Ham finished the season with 404 rushing yards on 82 carries (4.9 ypc) with two scores and also caught seven passes for 40 yards. On October 13 against Upper Iowa, he rushed for a season-high 105 yards.

As a sophomore, in 2013, Ham switched to running back and played in all 11 games, rushing 106 times for 422 yards (3.7 ypc and 35.2 ypg) and four rushing touchdowns. He rushed for a season-high two touchdowns and picked up 43 receiving yards against SMSU on November 16. His season-high in rushing yards came against MSU Moorhead on September 7 and Wayne State on October 5, games in which he rushed for 66 yards.

As a junior, in 2014, Ham played for the second straight season in all 11 games, making six starts at running back. He rushed 148 times for a team-high 774 yards (5.2 ypc and 70.4 ypg) and seven touchdowns, averaging 100.0 all-purpose yards per game. He recorded two 100-plus yard rushing games. He set a career-high in rushing yards in a game with 146 yards and two touchdowns at Minnesota Crookston on September 6. He rushed for 69 yards and two touchdowns against UMary on September 27, 2014.

As a senior, in 2015, Ham returned as a starter at running back and played in all 12 games. He rushed for a career-high 1,097 yards and 16 touchdowns and was selected to the All-NSIC second-team. In a game at Winona State on November 7, he recorded a career-high 30 carries while picking up 96 yards and three touchdowns. He helped lead Augustana to its first playoff appearance since 2010, finishing the regular season with 1,043 rushing yards and 15 rushing touchdowns. He entered the postseason with one rushing touchdown and 71 yards shy of Augustana's single season records after he became just the fourth back in program history to rush for 1,000-plus. He was voted by the NSIC football coaches as the 2015 NSIC Glen Galligan Award recipient. The award is given to a student or athlete who participates at his institution for four years and is academically superior while making a positive contribution to the institution.

Statistics

Track and field
During his freshman season, in 2012, Ham placed second with a season-best in the shot put at the Wayne State Dual on February 18. He earned fifth place at the NSIC Championships in the weight throw and shot put on February 25. He notched an eighth-place finish at the NSIC Championships on May 11 in the discus throw.

As a sophomore, in 2013, Ham finished seventh in the weighted throw at the Bison Open on February 9. He placed third in the shot put at the NSIC Championships on February 22.

As a junior, in 2014, Ham set the school record in the weight throw on February 21, 2015 at the USD Twilight. At the NSIC Championships, he placed second in the shot put. Outdoors, he notched an eighth-place finish in the hammer throw at the Howard Wood Dakota Relays on May 2, 2015.

As a senior, in 2015, Ham won the weight throw event at the NSIC Indoor Championships with a throw of 18.34 meters, and placed second in the shot put with a career best throw of 16.90 meters (55'4"), earning NCAA Provisional marks in both events. He also won both the shot put (16.37 meters) and weighted throw (19.02 meter) at the NWU Open.

Professional career

2016 season
In 2016, Ham participated in the Minnesota Vikings rookie minicamp, competing on a trial basis. On May 10, 2016, following the Vikings rookie minicamp, Ham was signed as a free agent to the 90-man roster becoming the fifth player in Augustana history to sign with an NFL team. In his first preseason game, Ham led the team in rushing with 35 yards on 12 carries, including a 10-yard touchdown, and catching one pass for 9 yards, defeating the Bengals 17–16. Ham led the Vikings in rushing yards in the preseason with 140 yards on 44 carries, including two touchdowns.

On September 3, 2016, Ham was released by the Vikings as part of final roster cuts and was signed to the practice squad the next day. He was promoted to the active roster on December 23, 2016.

2017 season
During rookie minicamp, Ham announced he was making the transition from running back to full-time fullback. He made the 53-man active roster and in Week 2 against the Pittsburgh Steelers, scored his first NFL touchdown on his first NFL carry with a one yard plunge from the goal line. Overall, he finished the 2017 season with seven carries for 13 rushing yards and a rushing touchdown to go along with seven receptions for 68 receiving yards.

2018 season
In the 2018 season, Ham appeared in 15 games and recorded 11 receptions for 85 receiving yards.

2019 season
In the 2019 season, Ham appeared in all 16 games and recorded 17 receptions for 149 receiving yards and one receiving touchdown.

2020 season
On March 18, 2020, Ham signed a three-year, $12.25 million contract extension with the Vikings. He was placed on the reserve/COVID-19 list by the team on November 19, 2020, and activated two days later.

Personal life
Ham is a physical education and health major at Augustana and plans on teaching and coaching football and track and field. Since his freshman season at Augustana, he volunteered as a peer educator and mentor in the Sioux Falls School District and volunteered weekly at the Boys and Girls Club.

Ham is a Christian. As a leader and member of Augustana's Fellowship of Christian Athletes, Ham spent time as a student engagement volunteer at Embrace Church. He volunteered as a speaker in advocacy groups for children with disabilities. Ham had a speech disorder that had affected him his entire life, and spoke about how kids can be successful in life if they believe in themselves. Ham has served on numerous projects with Habitat for Humanity with the Augustana football program during his career.

References

External links
Augustana Vikings bio
Minnesota Vikings bio

1993 births
American football running backs
Minnesota Vikings players
Living people
Players of American football from Duluth, Minnesota
Augustana (South Dakota) Vikings football players
African-American players of American football
21st-century African-American sportspeople
National Conference Pro Bowl players